Máximo González and Fabrício Neis were the defending champions but only Neis chose to defend his title, partnering Rafael Matos. Neis lost in the quarterfinals to Thiago Monteiro and Pedro Sakamoto.

Hugo Dellien and Guillermo Durán won the title after defeating Franco Agamenone and Fernando Romboli 7–5, 6–4 in the final.

Seeds

Draw

References
 Main Draw

Campeonato Internacional de Tênis de Campinas - Doubles
2018 Doubles